The Chorokh ( Ch'orokhi,  Ch’vorokh, Akampsis) is a river that rises in the Mescit Mountains in north-eastern Turkey, flows through the cities of Bayburt, İspir, Yusufeli, and Artvin, along the Kelkit-Çoruh Fault, before flowing into Georgia, where it reaches the Black Sea just south of Batumi and a few kilometers north of the Turkish-Georgian border.

In Arrian's Periplus Ponti Euxini, it is called the Acampsis; Pliny may have confused it with the Bathys. Procopius writes that it was called Acampsis because it was impossible to force a way through it after it has entered the sea, since it discharges its stream with such force and swiftness, causing a great disturbance of the water before it, that it goes out for a very great distance into the sea and makes it impossible to coast along at that point.

In English, it was formerly known as the Boas, the Churuk, or the Chorokh.

Biodiversity 
The Ch'orokhi valley lies within the Caucasus ecological zone, which is considered by the World Wide Fund for Nature and by Conservation International as a biodiversity hotspot. The Çoruh Valley is recognised by Turkish conservation organisations as an important plant area, an important bird area, a key biodiversity area and has been nominated as a high priority area for protection. This valley is rich in plants and contains 104 nationally threatened plant species of which 67 are endemic to Turkey.

Recreation 
The Çoruh has been called "an eco-tourism gem" and "Turkey's last remaining wild river", and is being promoted for whitewater kayaking by the Eastern Anatolia Tourism Development Project. It attracts kayakers and rafters from all over the world and was the site of the 4th World Rafting Championship in 1993 and the Coruh Extreme kayak competition in 2005.

Dams 
A total of 17 large hydroelectric dams are planned as part of the Çoruh River Development Plan but a total of 27 are proposed for the Çoruh River Catchment. Under the Çoruh Development Plan, 8 dams have been completed (Arkun, Artvin, Borçka, Deriner, Güllübağ, Murtli, Tortum and Yusufeli Dams), another 2 are under construction.

See also 
 European Rivers Network
 ECA Watch
 Friends of the Earth

References 

Rivers of Georgia (country)
Rivers of Turkey
International rivers of Asia
International rivers of Europe
 
Landforms of Bayburt Province
Landforms of Artvin Province
Landforms of Erzurum Province
Rivers of Artvin Province
Tributaries of the Black Sea